Plateumaris sericea is a species of beetle in the family Chrysomelidae. It is found in the Palearctic.

References

Donaciinae
Beetles described in 1758
Taxa named by Carl Linnaeus